Buitenkaag is a village in the Dutch province of North Holland. It is a part of the municipality of Haarlemmermeer, and lies about 8 km northeast of Leiden. The name Buitenkaag (Outer Kaag) refers to the town Kaag and the surrounding lake area, the Kagerplassen. The village officially received the name in 1859.

One of the most distinctive buildings in Buitenkaag is "Gemaal de Leeghwater", a pumping station named after Jan Leeghwater. Built in the mid-19th century to reclaim the Haarlemmermeer lake, it is still operational today. Originally, it was based on steam engine. In 1930, diesel engines were installed in the pumping station.

Gallery

References

Populated places in North Holland
Haarlemmermeer